The 86th Street Line or Streetcar Line #31 was a streetcar line in Brooklyn, New York City, United States, mostly running along Bath Avenue and other Streets between Coney Island and Sunset Park. Built by the Brooklyn and Queens Transit Corporation  as a Streetcar line this route has now been entirely replaced by the B64 bus.

History

The streetcar line was built by the Nassau Electric Railroad in 1894 to make more profits for the company. The company was later leased by the Brooklyn-Manhattan Transit Corporation. In 1929 the company made a subsidiary company, the Brooklyn and Queens Transit Corporation, to run multiple Streetcar lines one of which was the 86th Streetcar Line. The line ran entirely on surface level except for the northern terminal where it went onto an island platform. The 86th Streetcar Line had connections to multiple lines including the Bay Ridge Line, West End Line and the Fifth Avenue Line. In 1930, new tracks were made that split from the West End Line at 24th Avenue and went onto a right of way path used by trolleys to get to the Unionville Depot and onto Crospey Avenue. The 86th Street line would then later merge back with the West End Line at the intersection of Crospey and Stillwell avenue. The line closed on August 12, 1948 and was demolished some time later.

Pre-1930 Stations list

References

Streetcar lines in Brooklyn